The Riverwest Currents is a monthly newspaper published in Milwaukee, Wisconsin since 2001 by owner/publisher Vince Bushell. It has sometimes used the slogan "The Community Voice of Milwaukee's Left Bank," which was coined in 2001 by Dan Knauss (then the Currents' web editor) as a reference to the generally liberal or leftist reputation of the Riverwest neighborhood and the general ethos of the publication.

External links
Riverwest Currents official website

Newspapers published in Wisconsin
Mass media in Milwaukee